Suai is a city in East Timor, in Suai Subdistrict. Suai is the capital of the Cova Lima District, which is in the southwest of the country. It is located just a few kilometers from the Timor Sea, on the south side of the island.

Suai was the location of the Suai Church Massacre in September 1999. It was one of a number of massacres perpetrated by a pro-Indonesia militia in the time of the Indonesian withdrawal of East Timor.

Following the events of 1999, Suai entered into a friendship program with the City of Port Phillip, a bayside municipality south of Melbourne, Australia. Together they are working towards assisting the community of Suai recover.

Suai is served by Suai Airport which was expanded in 2017.

References

External links 

 

Populated places in East Timor
Cova Lima Municipality
Timor Sea